The Mexeflote is a landing raft used by the United Kingdom's Royal Logistic Corps and the Royal Australian Navy to move goods and vehicles between ship and shore. It was first used by British military in the 1960s.  It was used during the Falklands conflict, and has been used in humanitarian aid missions. The system is very similar to the Rhino ferry.

History
The Mexeflote was introduced to the UK military in the 1960s, and it subsequently saw service in the Falklands War, in which three units were used, including in Southampton, where they were used in loading the Royal Fleet Auxiliary and British Navy ships going to the Falklands.  Mexeflotes were used as causeways between ships in the open ocean, stores were driven between ships over a mexeflote causeway with Fiat Allis forklifts.  Sgt Boultby of 17 Port Regiment, RCT was awarded the Military Medal for using his Mexeflote to rescue survivors at Bluff Cove. 

In 1994, the Army ordered an additional 50 units, and in 2000 they upgraded 60 of the rafts.

Currently the rafts are crewed by the Royal Logistic Corps and they are largely used by the Royal Fleet Auxiliary's Bay class landing ships. As part of the Royal Australian Navy's acquisition of the Bay class ship RFA Largs Bay (renamed  for Australian service), two Mexeflotes were also acquired.

Design
Mexeflote is a powered raft (two diesel engines), used to move goods and vehicles between ship and shore when a pier is not available. The Mexeflote is designed in three sizes; 

Each version has three components; bow, stern, and centre, which can be fitted together as required, making the Mexeflote a versatile craft. The different sections allow it to be used as a raft, a floating pontoon, or as a causeway from ship to shore.

Mexeflote was the basis for the design of the Modular Elevated Causeway.

References

Further reading

Operational Testing of the Mexeflote Lashing and Launching System for Pontoon Causeways. - August 1970. Billie R. Karrh; James J. Traffalis; Naval Civil Engineering Lab.

Military vehicles of the United Kingdom
Amphibious warfare vessels of the British Army
Royal Logistic Corps